In mathematical analysis,  Zorich's theorem was proved by Vladimir A. Zorich in 1967. The result was conjectured by M. A. Lavrentev in 1938.

Theorem 

Every locally homeomorphic quasiregular mapping ƒ : Rn → Rn for n ≥ 3, is a homeomorphism of Rn.

The fact that there is no such result for n = 2 is easily shown using the exponential function.

References

 V.A. Zorich, "The global homeomorphism theorem for space quasiconformal mappings, its development and related open problems", M. Vuorinen (ed.), Quasiconformal Space Mappings, Lecture Notes in Mathematics, 1508 (1992) pp. 132–148

General topology